18 Warriors of Sui-Tang Period (隋唐十八条好汉) are 18 legendary and fictional heroes living in Sui Dynasty and early Tang Dynasty. The concept of 18 Warriors was first mentioned in the traditional historical novel Shuo Tang. The ranking of those 18 warriors was based on their skills in martial arts as well as their physical strength. Some of them somehow have historical archetypes such as Qin Shubao and Shan Xiongxin while others are created by authors of folk stories such as Luo Cheng and Yuwen Chengdu.

The ranking
The ranking itself is disputed, largely because the novel Shuo Tang only defined 13 out of all 18 warriors. Those 13 defined by the book Shuo Tang were generally accepted:
  Li Yuanba (李元霸)
  Yuwen Chengdu (宇文成都)
  Pei Yuanqing (裴元庆)
  Xiong Kuohai (熊阔海)
  Wu Yunzhao (伍云召)
  Wu Tianxi (伍天锡)
  Luo Cheng (罗成)
  Yang Lin (杨林)
  Wei Wentong (魏文通)
  Shang Shitu (尚师徒)
  Xin Wenli (新文理)
  N/A
  N/A
  N/A
  N/A
  Qin Shubao (秦叔宝)
  N/A
  Shan Xiongxin (单雄信)

However, who would fit in the rest 5 seats in this list are disputed. According to stories in the book, there are several possible figures, including Yuchi Gong (尉迟恭), Wang Bodang (王伯当), Cheng Yaojin (程咬金), Hua Gongyi (华功义), Liang Shitai (梁师泰), Han Qinhu (韩擒虎), Ma Shumou (麻叔谋), Cao Yanping (曹延平), etc. Also, some coeval (Sui and early Tang) individuals from history or other fictions are also potential candidates for this list, including Zuo Tiancheng (左天成), Lai Hu'er (来护儿), Luo Shixin(罗士信), Hou Junji (侯君集), Wang Junke (王君可), Wang Bo (王薄), Lu Mingyue (卢明月), etc.

The most popular version of the full list chooses Cao Yanping, Lai Hu'er, Liang Shitai and Zuo Tiancheng to be the No. 12 ~ 15 warriors and regards Yuchi Gong as the 17th.

Characters

Li Yuanba

In the novel
In the Shuo Tang, Li Yuanba (李元霸) is definitely the most powerful and skillful warrior in his time. He is the fourth son of Li Yuan(李渊), the founder of Tang Dynasty. He has a superb physical strength, which can be illustrated by his weapons: a pair of golden hammers with the weight of 400 jin(236.1 kg) each. With his help, Li Yuan not only defeated Turks, but also easily occupied the capital city Chang'an after his rebellion. However, Li Yuanba is not smart, sometimes even stupid. His teacher told him never to kill anyone using a Golden-Tang (a spades-like weapon) during a battle. However, Li Yuanba killed Wu Tianxi and Yuwen Chengdu, both of whom used Golden-Tangs, in two separate battles. After killing Yuwen Chengdu, Li Yuanba was trapped in a thunder storm. He was annoyed by the lightning and thunders, so he threw up his heavy hammers to beat the sky. When the hammer fell back to the ground, Li Yuanba was hit. He died under his own weapon.

Archetype
There are two archetypes of Li Yuanba. The first one is Li Xuanba (李玄霸), the third son of Li Yuan in the real history, who died young. Li Yuanba's name and social identity are derived from Li Xuanba. Another one is Li Daoxuan (李道玄), who was a famous royal-family general of the early Tang Dynasty. There are many similarities between Li Yuanba in the novel and Li Daoxuan in the history: great skills of martial arts, great generals, royal-family members, died at a young age, etc.

Yuwen Chengdu

In the novel
In the Novel, Yuwen Chengdu (宇文成都) is the elder son of Yuwen Huaji(宇文化及), a politically powerful man in Sui Dynasty. Before Li Yuanba became known, Yuwen Chengdu was regarded as the strongest warrior in Sui Dynasty. His weapon, as mentioned above, is a golden Tang, with a weight of 200 kg. He was so strong that normal opponents would flee away after hearing his name. In the battle of Siming Mountain, Yuwen Chengdu, alone, fought against the allies of Wu Yunzhao, Wu Tianxi and Xiong Kuohai, for a whole day, and eventually defeated the allies. He was generally regarded as a hero, but he was negatively influenced by his family, especially his father Yuwen Huaji, who killed Yang Guang, the emperor of Sui Dynasty, in a military rebellion. Yuwen Chengdu was killed by Li Yuanba during the battle of Lintong Pass after the military rebellion.

Archetype
Yuwen Chengdu is based on Yuwen Chengji (宇文承基), the son of Yuwen Huaji in real history. However, in the real history, Yuwen Chengji would just be a nobody without his father. After the military rebellion, Yuwen Chengji was killed by Dou Jiande (窦建德) along with his father Yuwen Huaji, uncle Yuwen Zhiji (宇文智及), and younger brother Yuwen Chengzhi (宇文承趾),the archetype of Yuwen Chenglong (宇文成龙) in the novel. The only survivor of his family, Yuwen Shiji (宇文士及), eventually became a top officer in Tang Dynasty.

Pei Yuanqing

In the novel
Pei Yuanqing (裴元庆) is the third strongest warrior in that period. Before Li Yuanba became known to all, Pei Yuanqing was the only one who could challenge Yuwen Chengdu. He was the third son of Pei Renji (裴仁基), the general of the troop stationed in Shanma Pass. Similar to Li Yuanba, Pei Yuanqing became famous in a young age and was known for his physical strength. His weapons are a pair of silver hammers with the weight of 150 kg each. He and his father and brothers were ordered to attack the rebellion army in Wagang Fort(瓦岗). Pei Yuanqing easily defeated tens of Wagong Warriors, including some famous ones in this list such as Qin Shubao and Shan Xiongxin (see below). However, later he and his family were framed by another general. Without any choices, Pei's family surrendered to Wagang Fort. Pei Yuanqing was killed by a fire attack during the battle of Linyang Pass.

Archetype
Pei Yuanqing is derived from the historical figure of Pei Xingyan (裴行俨), who, similar to Pei Yuanqing in the noval, was a young general in Sui Dynasty. The real history of Pei Xingyan and his father Pei Renji was similar to the story in Shuo Tang. The father and son were famous generals at that time. They were ordered to attack Wagang Fort, but they failed and then surrendered to the rebellion army. Later, Pei Xingyan became one of the four major cavalry officers in Wagang Fort. After the rebellion of Wagang Fort eventually ended with internal conflicts, Pei, along with Cheng Yaojin and Qin Shubao (See Below), joined another rebellion army led by warlord Wang Shichong (王世充). However, they soon realized that Wang Shichong was not a good leader. Cheng and Qin left for Li Yuan’s army but Pei and his father failed to escape. Later, Wang Shichong sentenced them to death.

Xiong Kuohai and Wu Brothers
Xiong Kuohai, Wu Yunzhao and Wu Tianxi are three totally fictional warriors in the novel of Shuo Tang. Generally, Xiong Kuohai and Wu Tianxi do not have archetypes in real history. Wu Yunzhao's archetype is argued.

Xiong Kuohai
Xiong Kuohai (雄阔海) was a famous brigand in Taihang Mountain area. There were two types of his stories. One version said that he liked to use a pair of axes while another version mentioned that his weapon was a heavy iron stick. Although, as a brigand, he ran his illegal business in the mountains, he was willing to help poor and homeless people near the camp of his brigand troop. He met the general Wu Yunzhao in Taihang Mountain and was persuaded to join the government troop to fight for the country. However, several months after that, Wu Yunzhao rebelled for his family (see below). As a result, Xiong Kuohai did not have a way to join the official military. Later, in Xiangzhou (相州), the cruel general Ma Shumou was stealing kids because he liked to eat young children. The governor of Xiangzhou, Gao Tansheng (高谈圣 in the book, or 高檀晟 in real history), was annoyed by this heartless behavior of the general from central military department of the country. Gao Tansheng found Ma Shumou and argued about this, but Ma sent Gao into the jail. Knowing about this, Xiong Kuohai got angry. He led his brigand troop to Xiangzhou and killed Ma Shumou. Then, he persuaded Gao Tansheng to upspring. After that, more and more upspring and rebellions happened all over the country due to the cruel rule of the emperor, corruption of local governments, and the endless war against Goguryeo Koreans and Turks. When the emperor Yang Guang was travelling to Jiangdu (江都), 18 major rebellion forces got together in Siming Mountain, a mountain located just on the emperor's way to Jiangdu, trying to overthrow the emperor and his dynasty. There, Xiong Kuohai, along with Wu Yunzhao and Wu Tianxi, fought against Yuwen Chengdu for a whole day. With the help of Pei Yuanqing, they nearly defeated the emperor's military force. However, after Li Yuanba came to help the emperor (that was before Li's family's rebellion), they failed to kill the cruel emperor Yang Guang. 
Years later, the central government wanted to put down all rebellions at ones. The emperor Yang Guang asked Yang Lin to set a martial arts test in Yangzhou (扬州) to attract heroes and warriors to that city. Their plan was that during the test, those warriors would fight against each other and maybe half of them would die in the chaos. Then Yang Lin would close the city gates of Yangzhou to trap the rest half of warriors. After that, they would use bombs and fires to kill all those warriors. At that day, the first half of plan worked: many warriors including Wu Yunzhao were killed in the battles. However, Xiong Kuohai was late for the test due to some other issues. When he arrived at the gate of Yangzhou, the heavy portcullis was dropping down. He suddenly realized the severe situation: he had to stop the closing gate or many warriors would die. Thus, he ran under the heavy portcullis (with a weight of 500 kg) and held it for a long time until most warriors escaped from Yangzhou. Then, he collapsed and died under the gate.

Wu Yunzhao
In the book, Wu Yunzhao (伍云召) was the son of a notable official Wu Jianzhang (伍建章). He usually used a long spear as his weapon, and he was also good at using swords. After knowing the fact that the former emperor Yang Jian was actually killed by the current emperor Yang Guang, Wu Jianzhang chided the current emperor for his cruel, illegal and immoral behavior. Yang Guang was annoyed and sent Wu Jianzhang and all his family members to death penalty. Fortunately, Wu Yunzhao was not in the capital city. He was already a famous general and staying with his troop in Nanyang Pass. Knowing the tragedy, he rebelled without hesitating to revenge for his family and overthrow the immoral emperor. The emperor Yang Guang ordered Han Qinhu, Yuwen Chengdu, Xin Wenli (See Below) and Shang Shitu (See Below), all great warriors, to attack Nanyang Pass. Wu Yunzhao's troop defeated troops of Han Qinhu, Xin Wenli and Shang Shitu, but they could not challenge Yuwen Chengdu. Wu sent his assistant Jiao Fang to break the encirclement to ask for help from his cousin Wu Tianxi. Before Wu Tianxi could reach Nanyang Pass, Yuwen Chengdu broke the city gate. Wu Yunzhao had to break the surrounding and flee away. He went over to Li Zitong (李子通), a local warlord in Shouzhou (寿州). Later, with Wu Yunzhao's help, Li Zitong became one of the major forces fighting against the Sui Dynasty. During the martial art test in Yangzhou, as mentioned above, a foreign warrior called Zuo Xiong killed Wu Yunzhao with a mechanism device hidden in Zuo's horse's tail.
Some people argue that Wu Yunzhao might have an archetype called Yang Xuangan (杨玄感), who had a notable social statues but rebelled after his father Yang Su’s (杨素) death. However, Yang Xuangan was killed as soon as his rebellion failed.

Wu Tianxi
Wu Tianxi (伍天锡) was the cousin of Wu Yunzhao. His weapon was similar to Yuwen Chengdu's golden Tang, but slightly less in weight. Unlike Wu Yunzhao's notable social status, Wu Tianxi was a brigand in Tuoluo Ville. When Wu Yunzhao was attacked by Yuwen Chengdu, his assistant Jiao Fang went to Tuoluo Ville to ask for help. Wu Tianxi then led his troop to Nanyang Pass to help Wu Yunzhao. However, when they went through the Taihang Mountain areas, they were stopped by Xiong Kuohai because of some small conflicts. Either of them knew each other's relationship with Wu Yunzhao. They fought against each other in Taihang Mountain for several days, until they both saw Wu Yunzhao and his remained troop fled to this place. It was then Wu Tianxi and Xiong Kuohai started to know each other. After Wu Yunzhao started to fight for Li Zitong, Wu Tianxi also joined that force. In Siming Mountain, Wu brothers and Xiong Kuohai defeated Yuwen Chengdu with the help from Pei Yuanqing. However, they were easily defeated by Li Yuanba in the next day. When Wu Tianxi was travelling to Yangzhou to take part in the martial art test, he met Liang Shitai (see below), who was the assistant officer in Li Yuanba's troop. Liang and Wu had some conflicts with each other, so they started to fight. Liang was killed, and then Li Yuanba was annoyed. Knowing that Liang was working for Li Yuanba, Wu Tianxi was shocked. He tried to apologize to Li Yuanba, but it was too late. Wu Tianxi tried to flee, but he was reached by Li Yuanba quickly in front of the Tianchang Pass. Then he was killed by the superb warrior during the ensuing battle.

Luo Cheng

In the novel
In the novel, Luo Cheng (罗成) was the son of Luo Yi (罗艺), a famous general guarding the northeastern frontier town of Sui Dynasty, the town of Jizhou (冀州), which is near modern-day Beijing. Luo's family had unique skills of using spears that outsiders were not allowed to learn. Luo Cheng was well educated, not only in martial arts, or especially, the family skills of spears, but also in traditional Chinese philosophy, literature, and military tactics and strategies. Most importantly, Luo Cheng was handsome in his appearance.

In the book of Shuo Tang, Luo Yi was always loyal to Sui Dynasty, but Luo Cheng took part in Wagang Fort rebellion. Later, after the failure of Wagang Fort rebellion, Luo Cheng joined Wang Shichong’s force. Years later, he was persuaded by his old time friends to switch to Li Shimin’s troop to fight for Li Yuan's Tang Dynasty. He defeated the ally of five warlords (Wang Shichong 王世充, Meng Haigong 孟海公, Gao Tansheng 高檀晟, Zhu Can 朱灿 and Dou Jiande 窦建德) within one day. Two years later, another ally led by Liu Heita (刘黑闼), Xu Yuanlang (徐圆朗), Shen Faxing (沈法兴), Gao Kaidao(高开道) and Tang Bi (唐壁) invaded Tang Dynasty. Luo Cheng took part in this war and he was killed by a general in Liu Heita's troop, Su Dingfang (苏定方), with arrows. However, the story behind that was the envy of Li Jiancheng and Li Yuanji towards Li Shimin. Luo Cheng was actually a victim of political conflicts among Li Yuan's sons.

There are much more folk stories about Luo Cheng outside of Shuo Tang, including his romantic love with Dou Jiande’s daughter Xianniang (窦线娘), and even with Hua Mulan (花木兰). His son Luo Tong (罗通) became a leading role in the sequel of Shuo Tang. The folk legends also believe that his descendant Luo Yanqing (罗延庆) was a general in Yue Fei’s troop in Song Dynasty.

Another interesting fact about Luo Cheng and his cousin Qin Shubao: 
As mentioned before, Luo's family had special skills and tactics in using spear; similarly, Qin's family has special skills in using Jian (锏, a type of prism-shaped weapon, generally a combination of sword and short stick). One day, they decided to teach each other their special skills in private. Luo said that he would teach all he knew to Qin; otherwise he would die under arrows. Qin told Luo that he would also teach all he knew, or he would be killed by a heavy object. Ironally, Luo Cheng kept his last and the best spear tactic, the Huimaqiang (回马枪: Make a fake retreat, and then suddenly stab back to the enemy when he or she is approaching from behind). At the same time, Qin Shubao also kept his last and the best Jian tactic, the Shashoujian (杀手锏: Also make a fake retreat. When the enemy attacks from the back, Qin would reach out the Jian on his right hand backwards to ward off the enemy's weapon, and then suddenly turn around and beat the enemy with another Jian on his left hand). They thought no one knew. However, as already mentioned, Luo Cheng was finally killed by arrows in a battle. Qin would also die after trying to rise up a heavy stone lion statue in a very old age (see below).

Archetype
In the real historical records, Luo Yi really had a son called Luo Cheng. However, other than his name, no more things Luo Cheng did were recorded. The novel Shuo Tang also glorified Luo Yi. In the novel, Luo Yi showed his loyalty. However, in reality, Luo Yi switched his position between Sui and Tang Dynasties and among many warlords for several times. Also, to glorify Luo Yi and Luo Cheng, this novel defamed Su Dingfang (苏定方), who was a loyal military genius in the history but a traitor in the novel. 
Luo Cheng's stories in this novel were mostly based on stories of Luo Shixin (罗士信) in the history. Luo Shixin was a young general in late Sui and early Tang dynasty. He started his career as a cavalry guard, and then he took part in Wagang Fort. At last he joined Tang Dynasty's force and helped Li Yuan and Li Shimin with unifying the country. He was also killed during a battle against Liu Heita, like Luo Cheng did in the novel. One thing needs to be clarified: in some versions of the novel, there is also a character called Luo Shixin. However, that character is totally different from Luo Shixin in the history. That is just a different role in the novel.

Yang Lin

In the novel
Yang Lin (杨林) was a member in royal family of Sui Dynasty. He was the cousin of Yang Jian, the founder of Sui. His weapon was a long stick called Qiulongbang (literally, the stick to seal dragons). Before the establishment of Sui Dynasty, Yang Lin was a general in Northern Zhou Dynasty, a major kingdom ruled by Yuwen family during Southern and Northern Dynasties era. He took part in the war that Northern Zhou Dynasty annexed Northern Qi Dynasty, another major kingdom in the same era. During the war, Yang Lin won a lot of battles, including the battle of Jizhou (济州) during which he killed the Northern Qi's general Qin Yi (秦彝), the father of Qin Shubao (see below). After his cousin Yang Jian took the place of Yuwen family and founded the Sui Dynasty, Yang Lin got a highest title of nobility. He was always loyal to Sui Dynasty even at the very end of his life. 
Yang Lin had several adopted sons; they were all well-skilled in the military or martial arts. When he first met Qin Shubao, he was impressed by Qin's martial arts strategies and military tactics. As a result, Yang Lin asked Qin to be his 13th adopted son. Qin thought it was a great opportunity to revenge for his father Qin Yi, so he became the Yang Lin's 13th taibao (太保, adopted son). However, he never had a chance to revenge since Yang Lin was much stronger than him. Later, Qin escaped from Yang Lin's home and joined the rebellion in Wagang Fort. Yang Lin was very angry after knowing one of his adopted sons betrayed him. He asked his troop to attack Wagang Fort, but unfortunately, just before Wagang Fort's collapse, Wagang Fort's smart officer Xu Shiji (徐世勣, or Xu Maogong 徐茂公) subverted Yang Lin's assistant general Tang Bi (唐壁 in the book, or 唐弼 in real history). At the same time, one of Yang Lin's former assistant, Cao Yanping (曹延平, see below), who was dismissed by Yang Lin without a good reason, came to reinforce Wagang Fort. Later, Qin Shubao's cousin Luo Cheng also came to help Wagang Fort. In the next battle, half of his adopted sons, including Lu Fang (卢芳), Xue Liang (薛亮) and Yang Daoyuan (杨道源), were killed by warriors in Wagang Fort. To make things worse, another rebellion group, led by Liu Liuwang (刘留王), attacked Yang Lin's base camp in Dengzhou (登州). Yang Lin had no choice but to retreat from Wagang Fort. 
After the country totally falls into a chaos, Yang Lin started to put down rebellions around the whole country. Some small rebellion groups were destroyed by him. However, in the battle of Siming Mountain (see above), Yang Lin was defeated and nearly killed by the angry Pei Yuanqing, who just suffered a loss in the battle against Li Yuanba. 
Yang Lin was the one who came up with the idea of Yangzhou's martial arts test. However, after the plan was proved to be a failure, Yang Lin and one of his adopted son, Yin Yue (殷岳), was ambushed by Qin Shubao and Luo Cheng. Yin Yue was killed by Qin Shubao during the battle, and Yang Lin was hurt by Luo Cheng. It was a great time for Qin Shubao to revenge for his father, but Qin decided to forgive Yang Lin, for Qin was also Yang Lin's adopted son and Yang Lin taught him a lot about military and martial arts. Also, unlike many other local governors or generals at that time, Yang Lin never did harm on but often protect common people, and that was why Qin Shubao respected Yang Lin though Yang Lin killed Qin's father. At that point, the dejected Yang Lin said that he never regretted to ask Qin Shubao to be his adopted son although later he knew Qin Shubao's father was Qin Yi, because Qin Shubao was a real hero. He said that he always respected Qin Yi for the loyalty he showed, but he had to kill Qin Yi because they were enemies at that time. He also told Qin Shubao that Sui Dynasty might not be able to survive at this point, but the good future of the common people would be relied on heroes like Qin Shubao and Luo Cheng. After that, Yang Lin committed suicide by cutting the throat.

Archetypes
Generally speaking, Yang Lin had three possible archetypes. All they three had some aspects that should be similar to Yang Lin, but none of them could totally and perfectly reflect Yang Lin's figure in the novel.
Yang Lin's identity and social status were according to Yang Xiong (杨雄), a famous general in Sui Dynasty's royal family. Yang Xiong was similar to Yang Lin because they were both close relatives to the emperors of Sui Dynasty and they were both military and martial arts elites. However, the difference was that in real history, Yang Xiong died at a much earlier time (612 A.D.) than Yang Lin's death in the novel (not mentioned exactly, but could be inferred to be around 618 A.D.). 
Yang Lin's stories were most likely based on stories of Lai Hu'er (来护儿) and Zhang Xutuo (张须陀). Lai Hu'er was a famous general in Sui Dynasty, and he was known for putting down rebellions in the basin of Huai River and the lower valley of Yangtze River. He was also the first one to discover the talent of Qin Shubao in the real history. Like Yang Lin, Lai Hu'er was always loyal to Sui Dynasty until his death. He was killed by Yuwen Huaji (宇文化及) during the military coup (see above). Although Lai Hu'er never appeared in the novel Shuo Tang, he was in the most accepted ranking list of the 18 warriors.
Zhang Xutuo was another famous military genius in Sui Dynasty who was known for fighting against rebellion forces in Yellow River basin, including Lu Mingyue (卢明月) and Sun Xuanya (孙宣雅). If Lai Hu’er was the first one to recognize Qin Shubao's talent, Zhang Xutuo was the first one who gave Qin Shubao the opportunity to foster his achievements. Qin Shubao and Luo Shixin became famous when he was an assistant general in Zhang Xutuo's troop. However, although Zhang Xutuo was the most considerable threats to Wagang Fort, it was Wagang Fort's forces that finally killed Zhang Xutuo during the battle of Xingyang.

Wei Wentong

In the novel
Wei Wentong (魏文通) was a major military officer whose base camp was in Tongguan Pass, one of the most important forts in central China. He had an appearance that was very similar to the famous Guan Yu in Three Kingdoms era, and his weapon was exactly the same as what Guan Yu used: a large-sized blade called Qinglong-Yanyue-Dao (青龙偃月刀, the Blade of Green Dragon & Crescent Moon). He took part in several remarkable battles including one with Wagang Fort. He was killed by the arrow from Wang Bodang (王伯当), the famous archer in Wagang Fort army.

Archetypes
Wei Wentong's name was from Wei Wentong (尉文通, same pronunciation but different characters), a leader of a small rebellion group in Yanmen Pass in late Sui Dynasty. However, his stories were more likely derived from stories of Wei Wensheng (卫文升) or Wei Xuan (卫玄). Wei Wensheng was a brave warrior in Sui Dynasty who got famous during a battle against Goryeo Koreans. After that battle, he became a general and was ordered to guard the Tongguan Pass. He died of an illness before the collapse of Sui Dynasty.

Shang Shitu and Xin Wenli
Shang Shitu (尚师徒) and Xin Wenli (新文理) were two totally fictional characters.

Shang Shitu
Shan Shitu was the general guarding the Linyang Pass. He was called the General with Four Treasures, because he had four unique treasures that no one else had: the Tilu Spear, the Horse of Hulei-Bao, the Yeming Helmet and the Fish Scale Armour. The Tilu Spear was a long spear with a fillister near the spearpoint. When enemies were hit by the Tilu Spear, their blood would come out quickly through the fillister which might lead them to die. The neighing of the Hulei-Bao would scare enemy's horses during the battle. The Yeming Helmet was made with luminous material which would benefit Shang Shitu during battles at night. The Fish Scale Armour was so hard and tight that normal swards and spears could not cut through it. 
Shang Shitu took part in several large-scaled battles. When Wagang Fort's forces expanded to Linyang Pass, he united with Xin Wenli's force to fight against Wagang Fort troops. He always had ambivalence. He was aware that what Wagang Fort did was good for common people, but he knew that he could never join Wagang Fort because he swore that he would never betray his country. At last, he chose to commit suicide, because by doing so he would neither betray the Sui Dynasty nor stop Wagang Fort from doing right things. Before his death, he gave the Tilu Spear and the Hulei-Bao to Qin Shubao as gifts.

Xin Wenli
Xin Wenli was the general guarding the Hongni Pass. His weapon was an iron Shuo (槊, a spear-like weapon with a big spearpoint). He was called the General of Eight Horses, not because he had eight horses for riding, but because his physical strength was superb enough to stop a cab towed by eight horses. His stories were similar to Shang Shitu's because they usually fight together. The most famous thing associated to Xin Wenli was that the famous warrior Pei Yuanqing was killed by bombs and fires from his troop. He died under the beleaguering of Wagong warriors including Qin Shubao, Cheng Yaojin, Wang Bodang and Shan Xiongxin. His sister, Xin Yue’e (新月娥), was a well-known female warrior at that time.

Cao Yanping
Cao Yanping (曹延平) was also called Ding Yanping (定延平) in different versions. He was only a small role in some versions of the book, and he did not have an archetype in real history. In both versions, his weapons were a pair of short spears.

Version 1
Cao Yanping was an assistant officer in Yang Lin's camp when both he and Yang Lin were young. One day, during a war-time tactical drill and simulation, his side defeated Yang Lin's side without mercy. Yang Lin was so annoyed and he dismissed Cao Yanping. Decades later, when Yang Lin's force attacked Wagang Fort, Cao Yanping reinforced Wagang Fort and fought against Yang Lin to revenge. Unfortunately, this time, he lost to Yang Lin and was killed during the battle. However, his reinforcement was one of keys for Wagang Fort to survive from Yang Lin's attacking. He was also the teacher of another great warrior, Zhang Shanxiang (张善相).

Version 2
Ding Yanping was a friend of Luo Yi's, and he was also the teacher of Luo Cheng when Luo Cheng was very young. When Yang Lin was attacking Wagang Fort, he was invited to reinforce Yang Lin. When he was on his way to Yang Lin's camp, he came across Luo Cheng. He had not seen Luo Cheng for several years, so he did not know Luo Cheng was already a member in Wagang Fort. Knowing Ding Yanping was to fight for Yang Lin, Luo Cheng gained the military plans from Ding Yanping by cheating. Ding Yanping and Yang Lin did not realize the truth until they lost several battles continuously. At last, Ding Yanping realized that his student was his opponent. He was extremely sad and left the camp alone in an evening. He neither went to Wagang Fort nor came back to Yang Lin's camp. No one knew where he went, and he has never been heard since.

Lai Hu'er
As mentioned above, Lai Hu’er (来护儿) was a historic figure who was hardly mentioned in the book of Shuo Tang but appeared in this list. He was a navy general and got famous when fighting against Goguryeo Koreans. He also put down several rebel generals in eastern China. Lai Hu’er was always loyal to Sui Dynasty until his death, even though one of his sons, Lai Yuan (来渊), joined the rebellion led by Yang Xuangan(杨玄感). He was killed by Yuwen Huaji’s army when he was trying to protect the emperor Yang Guang in Jiangdu during the mutiny.

Liang Shitai

In the novel
Like Cao Yanping, Liang Shitai (梁师泰) was a small supporting role in this book. He was the master of a big manor, called Guachui-Zhuang (挂锤庄, literally: the manor with a pair of hammers hanging at the gate). He used a pair of copper hammers as his weapon. When other warriors or heroes came to his manor, he'd like to fight against those warriors. If he could be defeated by the guest, or the guest could hold on fighting with him for a certain time, he would invite the guest into his manor and made friends with them. One day, the Wagang Fort warrior Shan Xiongxin (单雄信, See below) came to the manor after losing a battle. The tired and hungry Shan Xiongxin was easily defeated by Liang Shitai, so he was not invited by the host. Ironally, when Shan Xiongxin was on his way back to Wagang Fort, he came across Li Yuanba. Since Shan Xiongxin and Li Yuanba's first assistant officer Chai Shao (柴绍) were old time friends, he asked Li Yuanba for help. Li Yuanba came to the manor and easily defeated Liang Shitai. However, Li Yuanba noticed Liang Shitai's talents during the fight, so he invited Liang Shitai to be his trailbreaker troop's officer in the army. Then Liang Shitai started to work for Li's family. He was killed by Wu Tianxi near Tianchang Pass (see above).

Archetype
Liang Shitai's archetype might be Liang Shidu (梁师都), a leader of a rebellion group, and later a warlord, in Shuofang  (朔方). Liang Shidu rebelled in Sui Dynasty, and then obtained the support from Turks and became a powerful warlord in early Tang Dynasty. He was defeated by a troop led by Chai Shao and annexed by Tang's force in the year of 628. However, some people disagreed because they thought Liang Shidu was the archetype of another small character in the novel, Liang Shitu (梁师徒).

Zuo Tiancheng
Zuo Tiancheng (左天成) was a fictional general guarding the Sishui Pass. He was hardly mentioned in the book Shuo Tang, but he was very popular in folk cultures. He used a golden blade as his weapon and he was regarded as a top warrior in Sui Dynasty. He became famous in a young age, when he bravely ambushed a strong troop from a major Turks tribe in northern frontier. He used to fight alone against the Wangang Five Tigers (five best warriors in Wagang Fort, i.e. Qin Shubao 秦叔宝, Qiu Rui 邱瑞, Cheng Yaojin 程咬金, Wang Bodang 王伯当 and Shan Xiongxin 单雄信). The first time he lost in a battle was when he was defeated by Pei Yuanqing. He was always loyal to Sui Dynasty and was eventually killed by Xiong Kuohai during another battle.

Qin Shubao

In the novel
Qin Shubao (秦叔宝, or Qin Qiong 秦琼) was the most important role in Sui Tang. As mentioned above, he was the son of Qin Yi (秦彝, see Yang Lin's section) and used a pair of Jian (see Luo Cheng's section) as his weapons. Although he lost his father, he was well educated by his mother, Madam Ning. He was not only known for his great military and martial arts skills, but also for his reputation as a low-class government officer. He was kind to normal people but strict to his men. In folk cultures, there were so many his stories derived from the book Shuo Tang, including he selling his horse, fighting against Yang Lin and Wei Wentong, saving Li Yuan's family in Lintong Pass, and serving as a door god along with Yuchi Gong (see below), etc. He started as a low-class officer in Jinan, and then served under Luo Yi, Tang Bi and Yang Lin before took part in the Wagang Fort rebellion. After the collapse of Wagang Fort, he briefly served for Wang Shichong (王世充) and then joined the troop led by Li Shimin (李世民). He played a significant role in unifying the country. After Li Shimin became the second emperor of Tang Dynasty, Qin Shubao led a troop and defeated the Turks in the north. When Goryeo Koreans invaded the northeastern frontier, both Qin Shubao and Yuchi Gong wanted to lead military force to fight back. They agreed that the one who could hold a stone lion sculpture longer would be the general to fight against Koreans. Yuchi Gong could raise the lion but only for a while, but Qin Shubao could not only raise the lion but also walk back and forth in the yard for three times. However, after that, Qin Shubao suddenly collapsed. Later, Yuchi Gong became the general to fight against Goguryeo because Qin Shubao's situation was so bad. Qin Shubao died several weeks after Yuchi Gong left for Goguryeo Korea (see Luo Cheng's section). His son, Qin Huaiyu (秦怀玉), became one of the great warriors in next generation.

Archetype
Refer to Qin Shubao for details.
Qin Shubao was a real person in the history, and in this book, his life before joining the Tang Dynasty's troops was similar to the real history. However, some stories after he joined Tang Dynasty, especially after Li Shimin became the emperor, were fictional. In real history, Qin Shubao retired after Li Shimin became the emperor because of his illness. It was Li Jing (李靖) and Xu Shiji (徐世勣) rather than Qin Shubao that defeated the Turks.

Yuchi Gong

In the novel
Yuchi Gong (尉迟恭 or Yuchi Jingde 尉迟敬德) was a major character in the latter half of the book Shuo Tang, as well as in the sequel. He had a dark skin, and used a Bian (a columnar- and pagoda-shaped traditional Chinese weapon) as his weapon. His teacher told him that he could not survive without his Bian. He started as a blacksmith living in Taiyuan. After Li Yuan claimed Taiyuan's independence from Sui Dynasty, two of Li Yuan's sons, Li Jiancheng (李建成) and Li Yuanji (李元吉) were ordered to recruit soldiers in Taiyuan. However, due to their poor reputation, they could not recruit enough soldiers. Then, Li Yuanji advised Li Jiancheng to recruit under Li Shimin’s name because Li Shimin's reputation was much better than theirs. Thought Li Shimin was the general recruiting in Taiyuan, Yuchi Gong went there and became a soldier. However, he was unfairly treated by Li Yuanji's men. He got angry and left the camp. He thought it was Li Shimin who treated him like that.
Later, he joined another warlord, Liu Wuzhou (刘武周), near Taiyuan. The major military officer under Liu Wuzhou, Song Jingang (宋金刚), noticed Yuchi Gong's talent. Song asked Yuchi Gong to be his assistant officer. When Liu Wuzhou and Li Yuan came into a war, Yuchi Gong was extremely active during battles to revenge for the indignity he suffered in Li's camp. He led his men occupied Li Yuan's three cities during one day and eight villages during the following night. Li Yuanji and Li Jiancheng were defeated. At that time, Li Yuanba was already dead, so Li Yuan had to send Li Shimin to stop Yuchi Gong. One evening, when Li Shimin and Cheng Yaojin (程咬金, or Cheng Zhijie 程知节, another warrior known for his three fighting tactics with an axe) were marching, they were ambushed by Yuchi Gong at a creek called Meiliang-Chuan (美良川). Although Li Shimin and Cheng Yaojin were both great warriors, they were defeated. Li Shimin asked Cheng Yaojin to retreat first and find Qin Shubao for help. Cheng Yaojin worried that Yuchi Gong might kill Li Shimin when he was away. Yuchi Gong told him that he would not even try to kill Li Shimin before Qin Shubao was there, or he would die under the Zhijin Gate, a major gate in Chang'an. When Cheng Yaojin left, Li Shimin asked Yuchi Gong why he did not join Li's troop as he was from Taiyuan. Yuchi Gong was annoyed because he thought it was Li Shimin who affronted him in the camp. Li Shimin explained that he was not the one recruiting in Taiyuan, but it just made Yuchi Gong angrier. Then Yuchi Gong could not stop himself from attacking Li Shimin. Fortunately, Qin Shubao arrived at that time. Qin and Yuchi engaged in fighting at once. They drew in that battle, but Yuchi Gong used three tactics with his Bian, while Qin Shubao only used two tactics with his Jian. The battle of Meiliang-Chuan was called Three Bians versus Two Jians (三鞭换两锏) in folk cultures, and that was why people usually regarded Qin Shubao was a little better than Yuchi Gong in martial arts.
After that, Li Shimin beseeched Yuchi Gong to join his force for several times. Yuchi Gong was finally moved by Li Shimin. From others, Yuchi Gong also started to believe that it was not Li Shimin who treated him unfairly in the camp. Eventually, after the death of Liu Wuzhou and Song Jingang, Yuchi Gong surrendered to Li Shimin and became a major general fighting for Tang Dynasty. In the battle of Luo Yang, when Li Shimin was attacked by Shan Xiongxin, it was Yuchi Gong who saved Li Shimin. And when Li Shimin was framed by his brothers Li Jiancheng and Li Yuanji, Yuchi Gong played a big part in proving Li Shimin's innocence. Without Yuchi Gong, Li Shimin would never become the emperor.
When Yuchi Gong was fighting against Goryeo Koreans in later years (see Qin Shubao's section), he noticed the talent of a young warrior called Xue Rengui (薛仁贵, or Xue Li 薛礼). He pointed Xue Rengui as his adopted son because he believe Xue Rengui would be a decant squad in Tang Dynast's military. However, Xue Rengui was envied by Zhang Shigui (张士贵) and Li Daozong (李道宗). Zhang and Li tried to frame Xue Rengui. Xue Rengui was sent to jail after being set up by Zhang and Li. To save Xue Rengui, Yuchi Gong had conflicts with Li Daozong, and then, the emperor Li Shimin who believed in Li Daozong rather than Xue Rengui. After the judge announced that Xue Rengui would be sent to the death row, Yuchi Gong was so disappointed and angry. He hit the Zhijin Gate with his Bian to show his discontentment. He hit the gate so hard that his Bian broke into several pieces. He suddenly realized his teacher's words as well as what he did to Li Shimin in Meiliang-Chuan. He knew his time came, so he committed suicide in front of the Zhijin Gate. Li Shimin was very sad after knowing the death of Yuchi Jinde, so he put off the time to execute Xue Rengui and re-try the case. Later, Xue Rengui was proved to be innocent. Xue Rengui really became the best general in Tang Dynasty after several years. He defeated Turks, Tuyuhun, Tibetan Empire, Uighur Kingdoms, some city states and tribes along the Silk Road, and Korean Kingdoms in following years. Yuchi Gong's three sons, Yuchi Baolin (尉迟宝林, real in the history), Yuchi Baoqing (尉迟宝庆, fictional)and Yuchi Haohuai (尉迟号怀, fictional), were all great warriors in the next generation.

Archetype
Refer to Yuchi Gong for details.
Yuchi Gong was the person in Shuo Tang whose stories were closest to the real history. Although there was no Three Bians versus Two Jians in real history (Qin Shubao never used Jian in real history, and Yuchi Gong never used Bian either. They both used spears in real history), the battle of Meiliang-Chuan was real. Stories of the battle of Luo Yang and the conflict between Li Brothers were also true stories in the history. Yuchi Gong also had conflicts with Li Daozong in later years, which was recorded in different historical books. However, the reason he argued and beat Li Daozong was not because of Xue Rengui. In reality, both Zhang Shigui and Li Daozong in real history were great and loyal generals who contributed a lot to Tang Dynasty. Their contributions were no less than Yuchi Gong's and Xue Rengui's. Xue Rengui's talent was actually discovered by Zhang Shigui. Of course, Yuchi Gong never committed suicide. When he was old, he retired from the government and became a devout Taoist priest. He lived a happy and easy life for 16 years before his death.

Shan Xiongxin

In the Novel
Shan Xiongxin (单雄信, or Shan Tong 单通) was a major character in Shuo Tang. He was the master in the Erxian Manor and also the leader of greenwoods (绿林好汉, warriors and heroes that not worked for government). His weapon was a Shuo (see Xin Wenli's section). He was respected by various people because he was kind to poor people and heroes in need. He was Qin Shubao's best friend. He was also one of the leaders of Wagang Fort rebellion. After Wagang Fort's collapse, he served for the warlord Wang Shichong (王世充). When his old time friends including Qin Shubao, Cheng Yaojin (程咬金) and Xu Shiji (徐世勣, or Xu Maogong 徐茂公) were all leaving for Li Shimin, he stayed with Wang Shichong, because Li Shimin's father Li Yuan mistakenly killed his brother Shan Xiongzhong (单雄忠, or Shan Dao 单道) in early years. Later, he married Wang Shichong's daughter. After the battle of Luoyang, the ally of Wang Shichong, Meng Haigong (孟海公), Gao Tansheng (高檀晟), Zhu Can(朱灿) and Dou Jiande (窦建德) collapsed. Wang Shichong surrendered to Tang Dynasty, but Shan Xiongxin chose to die. Before he was beheaded, Qin Shubao, Cheng Yaojin and Xu Shiji came to see him in the jail. They drank a lot and cried a lot, saying they would be friends again in afterlife. Then, before the execution, Xu Shiji cut off a piece of flesh from his leg and asked Shan Xiongxin to eat, because they believed that with that flesh, they would be together forever. After Shan Xiongxin ate the flesh, he was executed.

Archetype
Shan Xiongxin was a real person in Sui Dynasty, and most stories in the book were close to the history. The book somehow glorified Shan Xiongxin because in real history he had several significant disadvantages in his personality. However, the story that he ate Xu Shiji's flesh was a real one which impressed people for thousand years.

References
 Shuo Tang by Unknown, Qing Dynasty
 Old Book of Tang, vol. 68.
 Zizhi Tongjian, vols. 182, 183, 185, 187, 188, 189, 190, 191.
 Old Book of Tang, vols. 2, 3.
 New Book of Tang, vol. 2.

Chinese folklore